Cunning may refer to:

 Cunning (owarai), a Japanese comedy group
 Cunning folk, a type of folk magic user
 Cunning (surname), a list of people with Cunning as a surname

See also

 Cunningham
 
 
 Sneak (disambiguation)
 Sly (disambiguation)